The Trapezuntine emperors were the rulers of the Empire of Trebizond, one of the successor states of the Byzantine Empire founded after the Fourth Crusade in 1204, until its fall to the Ottoman Empire in 1461. All but two of the Trapezuntine rulers belonged to the Komnenos dynasty, which had previously ruled the Byzantine Empire from 1081 to 1185, and they initially claimed to represent the legitimate line of Roman emperors, in opposition to the Latin Empire in Constantinople, the Laskaris dynasty of the Nicene Empire, and the Komnenos Doukas family of Epirus and Thessalonica.

Out of the Byzantine claimants that emerged in 1204 and thereafter, the Trapezuntine emperors, despite their illustrious descent, had perhaps the worst position. Not only were they far away from Constantinople in a peripheral province of the empire, but the reputation of the Komnenoi had been severely damaged by the detested last emperor of the dynasty, Andronikos I Komnenos, grandfather of the first Trapezuntine emperor Alexios I. Though they continued to claim to be the legitimate rulers of the entire former Byzantine Empire for decades thereafter, conflict with the Nicene Empire and the Sultanate of Rum in the early 13th century reduced the power of the Trapezuntine emperors. After the fall of Sinope to Sultan Kaykaus I in 1214, the Empire of Trebizond ceased to be a major contender for restoring the Byzantine Empire and became reduced to a small and local power.

After the Nicene Empire under Michael VIII Palaiologos retook Constantinople in 1261, the rulers of Trebizond continued to style themselves as 'Emperor and Autocrat of the Romans', viewing the Palaiologos dynasty as just another family of usurpers. The Trapezuntine title was altered in 1282, 21 years later, to 'Emperor and Autocrat of all the East, the Iberians, and the Transmarine Provinces' in order to placate Michael VIII Palaiologos after John II Megas Komnenos of Trebizond married his daughter, Eudokia Palaiologina. The Palaiologoi emperors in Constantinople did not consider the Trapezuntine emperors to be emperors at all, instead typically referring to them as "princes of the Lazes".

Although the Nicene emperors are generally regarded by modern historians to have been the legitimate Byzantine emperors from 1204 to the recapture of Constantinople in 1261, this is only because it was their successor state that eventually retook the city. The emperors in Trebizond and Thessalonica were no less legitimate emperors than those in Nicaea, the distinction only having been made retroactively as the Trapezuntines never succeeded in taking Constantinople and eventually gave up their claim to the Roman title. The line of Komnenos emperors in Trebizond lasted for more than 250 years, far longer than their dynasty had ruled from Constantinople, and outlasted the restored Byzantine Empire under the Palaiologos dynasty by eight years, before it too fell to the Ottoman Empire.

List of emperors and empresses regnant

Family tree of the Trapezuntine emperors

See also 

 List of empresses of the Byzantine successor states – for the consorts of the emperors
 List of Byzantine emperors – for the Byzantine emperors, from whom the Trapezuntine emperors claimed succession
 List of Roman emperors – for a list of emperors beginning with Augustus
 Succession of the Roman Empire – for various claims concerning the succession to the Roman Empire

Notes

References

Bibliography 
 
 

Trapezuntine
Trapezuntine 
Trapezuntine 
Emperors
Trapezuntine